Enchantment may refer to:

Incantation or enchantment, a magical spell, charm or bewitchment, in traditional fairy tales or fantasy
The sense of wonder or delight

Books 
Enchantment (novel), a 1999 fantasy novel by Orson Scott Card
Enchantment, a 1917 book by E. Temple Thurston 
Enchantment, a 1989 book by Monica Dickens
Enchantment, a 2011 book by Guy Kawasaki

Music 
Enchantment (band), a 1970s R&B band
Enchantment (Enchantment album), the debut album by Detroit, Michigan-based R&B group Enchantment
Enchantment (Charlotte Church album), the fourth music recording/album featuring Charlotte Church
Enchantment (Chris Spheeris album)
Enchantment, an album by the Celtic folk-rock band Uffington Horse
"Enchantment", a song by Corinne Bailey Rae on her eponymous album
The Enchantment, a 2007 album by Chick Corea and  Béla Fleck

Film 
Enchantment (1920 film), a 1920 British silent film starring Mary Odette
Enchantment (1921 film), a 1921 American silent film starring Marion Davies
Enchantment (1948 film), a 1948 American film starring David Niven

Other uses 
Enchantment, a type of card in the collectible card game Magic: The Gathering
Enchanting (programming language), educational programming language designed to program Lego Mindstorms NXT robots
The Enchantments, an area within the Alpine Lakes Wilderness of the Cascade Range
Enchantment, a way to improve equipment using magic in the video game Minecraft

See also 

 Enchant (disambiguation)
 Enchanted (disambiguation)
 Enchantress (disambiguation)
 Enchanter (disambiguation)
Incantation (disambiguation)
Thrall (disambiguation)
Disenchantment